Évry-Grégy-sur-Yerre is a commune in the Seine-et-Marne department in the Île-de-France region in north-central France. It was established on 1 January 1973 from the amalgamation of the communes of Évry-les-Châteaux and Grégy-sur-Yerre.

Demographics
Inhabitants are called Évéryciens.

See also
Communes of the Seine-et-Marne department
 Château de Grégy

References

External links

 Town Hall

Communes of Seine-et-Marne